Victoria Baths is a Grade II* listed building, in the Chorlton-on-Medlock area of Manchester, in northwest England. The Baths opened to the public in 1906 and cost £59,144 to build. Manchester City Council closed the baths in 1993 and the building was left empty. A multimillion-pound restoration project began in 2007. As of 2009, the building is on English Heritage's Heritage at Risk Register.

History

The baths were designed by the City Surveyor, T. de Courcy Meade, and his assistant, Arthur Davies. The work was supervised by Henry Price, the newly appointed city architect.  The baths were opened in September 1906 by the Lord Mayor of Manchester who described the building as a "water palace". For 86 years the Baths provided both essential and leisure facilities. Private baths and a laundry were housed there along with three swimming pools and a Turkish bath, later a Sauna was added. The main swimming pool was floored over in the winter months to hold dances. In 1952 the Victoria Baths installed the first public Aeratone (jacuzzi) in the country.

In the design and construction of the Baths, a great deal of money was expended, Manchester having at that time one of the world's wealthiest municipal coffers. The façade has multi-coloured brickwork and terracotta decoration, the main interior public spaces are clad in glazed tiles from floor to ceiling and most of the many windows have decorative stained glass.

The Baths were closed by Manchester City Council in 1993. The Friends of Victoria Baths was formed and began to investigate the possibility of running the Victoria Baths independently.

Various fund-raising attempts failed to bring about a restoration of the Baths, although work to prevent further deterioration of the building started in 1998.

Restoration

In September 2003, the Baths won the first series of the BBC's Restoration programme.  The building was chosen by a public phone-vote from a short-list of ten buildings in danger of dereliction in the UK. It was awarded £3.4 million from the Heritage Lottery Fund and the money raised through the phone-voting process.  The Prince of Wales visited the baths a month later to help celebrate the win.

It was intended that the money would be spent on re-opening the Turkish bath by around 2006, with other parts following later at a cost of around £15–20m. However, the redevelopment plans were dealt a blow one year later when quantity surveyors delivered a much larger estimate of £6.3m to restore the Turkish baths. The Heritage Lottery Fund requested further details about the full redevelopment before they would hand over any money for the first phase. Final planning approval to begin a restoration process was not received until September 2005.

In September 2006, as part of a number of events to mark the centenary of the building's opening, the gala pool was filled for the first time in 13 years. 

The first phase of restoration work consisting of structural work and repairs began on Monday 19 March 2007, and was completed in September 2008. In 2011 the Baths were used as a filming location, a concert venue, and an exhibition centre. On 16 April 2017, the baths were once again reopened for an invite only acid house dance pool party hosted by Boiler Room; The Warehouse Project; and Fac 51 The Warehouse. This was called "The Other Side of Midnight". The event was also live streamed on YouTube, the video is unlisted.

See also

Grade II* listed buildings in Greater Manchester
Listed buildings in Manchester-M13
Mayfield Baths

References

Further reading

External links
 Official website 
 BBC Restoration website
  Victoria Baths Manchester Archives+

Buildings and structures completed in 1906
Grade II* listed buildings in Manchester
1906 establishments in England